Rabeh (also Romanized as Raʿbeh) is a village in Ekhtiarabad Rural District, in the Central District of Kerman County, Kerman Province, Iran. At the 2006 census, its population was 26, in 7 families.

References 

Populated places in Kerman County